Kelcey Paul Ayer is an American musician and co-founder of Los Angeles-based indie rock band Local Natives. In 2017, Ayer released a solo album as Jaws of Love.

Career 
Ayer was raised in Orange County, California, where he was a neighbor of Taylor Rice and Ryan Hahn. The three began performing music together while attending Tesoro High School. Ayer attended San Francisco State University before transferring to the University of California, Los Angeles, though he dropped out to pursue music full time.

Local Natives have since released four studio albums since forming in 2005. Ayer plays keyboards, percussion, and guitar, in addition to vocals. All members split work on the band's musical output evenly, including cover artwork and songwriting.

Discography 
With Local Natives
 Gorilla Manor (2009)
 Hummingbird (2013)
 Sunlit Youth (2016)
 Violet Street (2019)

As "Jaws of Love."
Tasha Sits Close to the Piano (2017)

References 

Musicians from Orange County, California
American multi-instrumentalists
American indie rock musicians
Year of birth missing (living people)
Living people
San Francisco State University alumni
University of California, Los Angeles alumni